William Halop (February 11, 1920 – November 9, 1976) was an American actor.

Early life
Halop was born to Benjamin Cohen Halop and Lucille Elizabeth Halop on February 11, 1920.
Halop came from a theatrical family; his mother was a dancer, and his sister, Florence Halop, was an actress who worked on radio and in television. Additionally, he had a brother named Joel.

Acting career
In 1933, he was given the lead as Bobby Benson in the popular new radio show The H-Bar-O Rangers. From 1934 to 1937, he starred in one of his first radio series, playing Dick Kent, the son of Fred and Lucy Kent, in "Home Sweet Home".

While studying at the Professional Children's School in New York, he was cast as Tommy Gordon in the 1935 Broadway production of Sidney Kingsley's Dead End and traveled to Hollywood with the rest of the Dead End Kids when Samuel Goldwyn produced a film version of the play in 1937. Usually called Tommy in the films, he had the recurring role of a gang leader in a series of films that featured the Dead End Kids, later billed Little Tough Guys. In his later years, he claimed that he was paid more than the other Dead End actors, which had contributed to bad feelings in the group, and that he was tired of the name "Dead End Kids". He played with James Cagney in Angels with Dirty Faces (1938), and he also played the bully Harry Flashman, speaking with an English accent, in the 1940 film Tom Brown's School Days opposite Cedric Hardwicke and Freddie Bartholomew.

After serving in World War II in the US Army Signal Corps, he found that he had grown too old to be effective in the roles that had brought him fame. At one point, he was reduced to starring in a cheap East Side Kids imitation at PRC studios, Gas House Kids (1946), at age 26. Diminishing film work, marital difficulties, and a drinking problem eventually ate away at his show business career.

In the 1970s, Halop enjoyed a career resurgence playing the character Bert Munson, cab driver and close friend to Archie Bunker on the television series All in the Family. He appeared in 10 episodes from 1971 to 1975, including the famed "Sammy's Visit" episode from the second season in 1972 starring Sammy Davis, Jr.

Personal life
Halop was married at least four times, according to interviews given near the end of his life. Helen Tupper was his first wife from 1946 until their divorce in 1947. On Valentine's Day, 1948, he married Barbara Hoon. Their marriage lasted ten years until their divorce in 1958. His third marriage in 1960 to Suzanne Roe, who had multiple sclerosis, lasted until their divorce in 1967.

The nursing skills he learned while taking care of his third wife led him to steady work as a registered nurse at St. John's Hospital in Santa Monica, California. His fourth marriage, to a nurse coworker, whose name has not been publicized, was quickly annulled after she allegedly attacked him. He later moved back in with his second wife Barbara, but they chose not to remarry. 

Following two heart attacks, Halop underwent open-heart surgery in the fall of 1971.

He died of a heart attack on November 9, 1976, in Hollywood at the age of 56. He is interred at Mount Sinai Memorial Park Cemetery in Los Angeles, California.

Filmography

Films (partial)

Dead End (1937) as Tommy
Crime School (1938) as Frankie Warren
Little Tough Guy (1938) as Johnny Boylan
Angels with Dirty Faces (1938) as Soapy
They Made Me a Criminal (1939) as Tommy
You Can't Get Away with Murder (1939) as Johnny Stone
Hell's Kitchen (1939) as Tony
The Angels Wash Their Faces (1939) as Billy Shafter
Dust Be My Destiny (1939) as Hank Glenn
On Dress Parade (1939) as Cadet Maj. Rollins
Call a Messenger (1939) as Jimmy Hogan
Tom Brown's School Days (1940) as Flashman
You're Not So Tough (1940) as Tommy Abraham Lincoln
Junior G-Men (1940, serial) as Billy Barton
Give Us Wings (1940) as Tom
Sky Raiders (1941, serial) as Tim Bryant
Hit the Road (1941) as Tom
Mob Town (1941) as Tom Barker
Sea Raiders (1941, serial) as Billy Adams
Blues In The Night (1941) as Peppi
Junior G-Men of the Air (1942, Serial) as Billy 'Ace' Holden
Tough As They Come (1942) as Tommy Clark
Junior Army (1942) as James 'Jimmie' Fletcher
Mug Town (1942) as Tommy Davis
Gas House Kids (1946) as Tony Albertini
Dangerous Years (1947) as Danny Jones 
Challenge of the Range (1949) as Reb Matson
Too Late for Tears (1949) as Boat Attendant (uncredited)
Air Strike (1955) as Lt. Cmdr. Orville Swanson
Boys' Night Out (1962) as Elevator Operator (uncredited)
The Courtship of Eddie's Father (1963) as Milkman (uncredited)
For Love or Money (1963) as Elevator Operator
The Wheeler Dealers (1963) as Subpoena Server (uncredited)
A Global Affair (1964) as Cab Driver
Mister Buddwing (1966) as Fredrick Calabrese 2nd Cab Driver
Fitzwilly (1967) as Restaurant Owner (uncredited)

Television

References

External links

 

 
 Radio interview with Billy Halop

1920 births
1976 deaths
Male actors from New York (state)
American male film actors
American male radio actors
United States Army personnel of World War II
American nurses
American male television actors
Jewish American male actors
Male actors from New York City
Burials at Mount Sinai Memorial Park Cemetery
Male nurses
20th-century American male actors
20th-century American Jews